Ruth Margaret Kempson, FBA (born 26 June 1944) is a British linguist. She is Emeritus Professor of Linguistics at King's College, London.

In 1977, Kempson published Semantic Theory, which discusses the concept of entailment in linguistics. A proposition (P) is entailed by another (Q) if P is true when Q is true and Q is false when P is false, but Q is not strictly defined if P is true. She was awarded a Fellow of the British Academy in 1989. She has made contributions to the theoretical framework of Dynamic syntax.

References

Semanticists
Syntacticians
Fellows of the British Academy
Academics of King's College London
1944 births
Living people
Philosophers of linguistics